Jobvite Inc. is an Indianapolis, Indiana software and recruiting corporation.

History 
Jobvite, Inc. was established in 2003 by Jesper Schultz and Hans Larsen, under the name ForumJobs, Inc. The company name was changed to Jobvite in 2006.

In July 2008, Dan Finnigan, formerly of Yahoo! and hotjobs.com, was appointed as the CEO of the company.

Investments and company expansion 
In September 2010 Jobvite formed a partnership with SuccessFactors Business Execution (BizX) Suite. The partnership added BizX Suite's 8 million plus users to the Jobvite search platform.

In October 2014, Jobvite received $25 million in investments from New York City-based growth equity firm Catalyst Investors. They joined Trident Capital, CMEA Capital, and ATA Ventures as one of the firm’s chief investors. Investment in the company amounted to more than $55 million at the time.

In August 2015, the company launched operations in London, England. By 2019, the company had additional offices in Chicago, Boston and Bengaluru, India.

In February 2019, K1 Investment Management invested more than $200 million dollars in Jobvite. Part of the funds assisted in Jobvite’s acquisition of three companies, Talemetry, RolePoint and Canvas. The acquisition resulted in an additional 2,000 customers for Jobvite, including Fortune 500 companies.

In April 2021, K1 Investment Management purchased and merged Jobvite with JazzHR and NXTThing RPO. Peter Lamson, the CEO of JazzHR will now serve as the CEO for the combined companies.

Services 
In 2014, Jobvite was cited as being a server to over 1600 global companies, with over 46 million job seekers worldwide. Jobvite specializes in the provision of a Software as a Service (SaaS) recruiting platform. Its web-based service enables its clientele to create job invitations, known as "jobvites," to business associates and employees, or on social networking sites such as Facebook or LinkedIn, making it a viable social recruiting provider to companies to post job openings and manage the recruitment process. Its clientele include Twitter, LinkedIn, Schneider Electric, and Gamesys.

Jobvite offers a number of features within its recruiting platform. These include:

 Jobvite Video: a platform used for interviewing potential employees by video. 
 Jobvite Hire: an applicant tracking system (ATS) tool for monitoring and managing recruitment by both hiring managers and applicants, 
 Jobvite Refer: a recruitment feature that allows employees to send out "jobvites" on social networking sites and monitor progress. 
 Jobvite Engage: a CRM for tracking and recording the interactions of qualified prospects from social networking sites and résumé databases. 
 Jobvite Onboard: a platform that houses traditional onboarding human resources materials in digitized form.

In 2010 its most popular application was “Work With Us”, which had roughly 5,000 active users every month at the time.

Jobvite has become known for its surveys into social recruitment, and is frequently cited as a source by media outlets such as Time, Inc., and numerous authors of books on social and human resource management.

References

External links 
 Official Website
 Recruitment Technology Comparison

Business services companies established in 2006
Recruitment software
Software companies based in the San Francisco Bay Area
Online companies of the United States
Privately held companies of the United States
Cloud computing providers
Professional networks 
Surveys (human research)
Software companies of the United States